The Vinland flag is a Nordic cross flag designed by American gothic metal band Type O Negative. The flag was used to symbolize a variety of frontman Peter Steele's interests and political ideals (paganism, nature connectedness, and socialism), including his own Scandinavian heritage. Viking explorers visiting North America around the year 1000 called one of the areas they came to "Vinland". The flag appears on various Compact Disc covers produced by the group, sometimes with the slogan "made in the People's Technocratic Republic of Vinland", and adorns various pieces of Type O Negative merchandise. The flag strongly resembles the unofficial flag of the Forest Finns adopted in 1978.

The first physical Vinland flags went up for sale in 2004. Various far-right groups, other extremist groups and some Germanic neopagan groups in North America adopted the symbol as an ethnic flag, commodiously identifying the name of the 11th-century Norse colony at L'Anse aux Meadows, Newfoundland, called Vinland in the Norse sagas, with the predominantly Anglo-American inhabited areas of the modern nations of Canada and the United States.

In the early 2000s, the white supremacist skinhead group Vinlanders Social Club widely appropriated the flag. In response, the Anti-Defamation League designated the flag as a potential hate symbol, while making distinctions for the use of the flag by non-racists and supporters of Peter Steele and the Band Type O Negative. As such, the use of the flag should always be carefully considered and judged by its context.

See also

List of symbols designated by the Anti-Defamation League as hate symbols

References

External links
 The Vinland flag, neo-pagan Ásatrú flag, and Norwegian flag prior to being deployed at Burning Man

Vinland
Vinland
Religious flags
White nationalist symbols